Borko is a village and rural commune in the Cercle of Bandiagara of the Mopti Region of Mali. The village lies on the edge of the Dogon Plateau, 105 km northwest of Mopti and 73 km north-northwest of Bandiagara. In the 2009 census the commune had a population of 6,254. The village is set in a valley, and is only accessible by one entrance.

Najamba-Kindige is spoken in the village of Borko.

References

External links
.

Communes of Mopti Region